Telisai–Lumut Highway is the third highway in Brunei Darussalam, being the other two which is the Muara–Tutong Highway and Sultan Hassanal Bolkiah Highway. The new highway  was completed in late June 2016, and has been handled by the Brunei Economic Development Board (BEDB).

This dual carriageway will be built from Lumut Bypass (dual carriageway) stretching eastwards through the woods at about 3 kilometres south of the remaining stretch of Jalan Tutong-Seria (see note) (single carriageway), merging with the dual carriageway Tutong Bypass at north-east. The total length of the highway is 18.6 kilometres (11.6 miles).

The new highway will ease traffic between Tutong and Kuala Belait, cutting travel times between the affected stretch.

After more than 3 years delay, the highway was finally opened for public use on 28 June 2016.

Notes
 Parts of the original Jalan Tutong-Seria single carriageway had been replaced by Tutong Bypass and Lumut Bypass dual carriageways, leaving the Telisai-Sungai Liang stretch only used by regulars.

References

Further reading
 "Slow moving traffic in Belait leaves motorists fuming" Page 6 - Borneo Bulletin Volume 16 Issue 57 dated 6 September 2011

External links
 Brunei Economic Development Board Official Website

Roads and Highways in Brunei